D.650 is a north to south state road in Turkey. It starts at Karasu at the Black Sea coast and ends at Antalya at the Mediterranean Sea coast. Since it runs all the way from north to south, it crosses many state roads including D.100, D.200, and D.300.

Itinerary

See also
Osmangazi Tunnel

References

650
Transport in Sakarya Province
Transport in Bilecik Province
Transport in Kütahya Province
Transport in Afyonkarahisar Province
Transport in Burdur Province
Transport in Antalya Province